The United Arab Emirates national futsal team represents United Arab Emirates in futsal.

Tournament

World Cup
 1989 – Did not enter
 1992 – Did not enter
 1996 – Did not enter
 2000 – Did not enter
 2004 – Did not enter
 2008 – Did not enter
 2012 – Did not qualify
 2016 – Did not qualify
 2020 – Did not qualify

Asian Cup

Reference

External links
  Official website

United Arab Emirates